Trailer Nos. 55 – 56 are trailers of the Manx Electric Railway on the Isle of Man.

These two trailers have provided part of the mainline running fleet for many years and rarely exited service, except for routine maintenance.  However, in 1999 trailer 56 was removed from service and has since been converted into the line's only disabled access saloon featuring removable swivel seating, hydraulic wheelchair ramps and accommodation for carers; at this time the car was also fitted with a public address system for use with winter saloon No. 22 for commentary guided trips of the line.  Although bearing little resemblance to its original configuration the trailer was painted into traditional "house" colours of red and cream and sees limited service on the line subject to demand.  Prior to is conversion there was no provision for disabled passengers on the railway.

References

Sources
 Manx Manx Electric Railway Fleetlist (2002) Manx Electric Railway Society
 Island Island Images: Manx Electric Railway Pages (2003) Jon Wornham
 Official Official Tourist Department Page (2009) Isle Of Man Heritage Railways

Manx Electric Railway